The 2007 Individual Long Track/Grasstrack World Championship was the 37th edition of the FIM speedway Individual Long Track World Championship.

The world title was won by Gerd Riss of Germany for the sixth time.

Venues

Final Classification

References 

2007
Speedway competitions in France
Speedway competitions in Germany
Long